Feel Me may refer to:

 Feel Me (album), a 1980 album by Cameo
 "Feel Me" (Blancmange song), 1982
 Feel Me (Selena Gomez song), 2020
 "Feel Me" (Tyga song), 2017